Anthony Buchanan (born 30 June 1955 in Ystradgynlais, Wales) is a former rugby union player. A prop forward, Buchanan made his international debut for Wales versus Tonga on 29 May 1987. He played for Wales in the first Rugby World Cup later that year and he featured in the Wales Triple Crown winning team of 1988.

Buchanan played his domestic rugby at Llanelli RFC and he later became Director of Rugby at Llanelli.

References

See also
 Llanelli profile
 

1955 births
Living people
People from Brecknockshire
Rugby union players from Powys
Welsh rugby union players
Wales international rugby union players
Llanelli RFC players
Rugby union players from Ystradgynlais
Rugby union props